Glendon Howard Cohen (born 22 April 1954) is a male retired Jamaican-born British track and field athlete who competed in the sprints.

Athletics career
Born in Linstead, St. Catherine, Jamaica, he moved over to England as a child, growing up in Wolverhampton, and represented Great Britain at the Olympic Games of 1976 and 1980 in the 400 metres. He was a member of Wolverhampton & Bilston Athletics Club.  His personal best of 45.49 was achieved in 1978. He represented England in the 400 metres and 400 metres relay events, at the 1978 Commonwealth Games in Edmonton, Alberta, Canada.

Personal life
He is the father of professional footballer, Gary Cohen. He also has two other sons, Richard and Anderson Cohen.

References

Living people
1954 births
Sportspeople from Wolverhampton
People from Saint Catherine Parish
British male sprinters
English male sprinters
Olympic athletes of Great Britain
Athletes (track and field) at the 1976 Summer Olympics
Athletes (track and field) at the 1980 Summer Olympics
Commonwealth Games competitors for England
Athletes (track and field) at the 1978 Commonwealth Games
European Athletics Championships medalists
Migrants from British Jamaica to the United Kingdom